TS or Ts may refer to:

Businesses and organizations
 Air Transat (IATA code TS), a Canadian airline
 Tenaris (NYSE symbol), a global manufacturer of steel pipe products
 Theosophical Society, religious philosophy
 Tidewater Southern Railway (reporting mark TS), a former US railroad
 Trabzonspor, a Turkish Football Club
 Transcendental Students, a former radical student group at NYU
 TS Ferries, an Estonian ferry line

Linguistics
 Ts (digraph), a digraph in the Latin alphabet
 Voiceless alveolar sibilant affricate (or ), a type of consonantal sound
 Tse (Cyrillic) (Ц ц), the Cyrillic letter representing the voiceless alveolar affricate
 Tsonga language (ISO 639 code: ts), of southern Africa

Science and technology
 Tensile strength, in materials science

Biology and medicine
 Transverse section, a term used in microscopy when prepared slide has a sample transversely dissected.
 Thymidylate synthase, the enzyme used to generate thymidine monophosphate
 Tourette syndrome, a neurological condition involving involuntary tics
 Turner syndrome, a condition in which a female is partly or completely missing an X chromosome

Chemistry
 Tennessine, symbol Ts, a chemical element
 Tosyl, a group in organic chemistry
 Transition state, of a chemical reaction

Electronics and computing
 MPEG transport stream, a digital media container format
 Telesync, a bootleg recording of a film recorded in a movie theater
 Terminal Services, a component of Microsoft Windows operating systems
 Tip-Sleeve, a standard monaural phone connector
 TypeScript (file extension .ts), a Microsoft programming language

Mathematics
 Tabu search, a search method
 Tate–Shafarevich group, in arithmetic geometry

Transportation
 Twin Spark, an Alfa Romeo car engine technology
 Turbine Steamship (ship prefix)
 Training Ship (ship prefix)
 Telangana State (vehicle registration code TS), India
 Tunisia (aircraft registration prefix TS)

Other uses
 Teaspoon (ts.), a measure in cooking
 ISO Technical Specification, e.g. ISO/TS 16949:2009
 TinySex, a slang term in sexual roleplay
 Top Secret, a security classification
 Transsexual, a person whose gender identity is inconsistent with their assigned sex
 TeamSpeak, a proprietary voice-over-Internet Protocol application for audio communication
TS postcode area, UK
Transition School, a one-year program at the University of Washington; see Transition School and Early Entrance Program

See also
 Models of Ibanez Tube Screamer guitar overdrive pedal, e.g. TS7